Valopicitabine (NM-283) is an antiviral drug which was developed as a treatment for hepatitis C, though only progressed as far as Phase III clinical trials. It acts as a RNA-dependent RNA polymerase inhibitor. It is a prodrug which is converted inside the body to the active form, 2'-C-methylcytidine triphosphate.

References 

Anti–RNA virus drugs
Antiviral drugs